Kedus Harbe was King of Zagwe dynasty. According to Taddesse Tamrat, he was the son of Jan Seyum, the brother of Tatadim. Some authorities date his reign to the years 1079–1119. G.W.B. Huntingford does not include him in his list of kings of the Zagwe dynasty.

Reign
According to Richard Pankhurst, Kedus Harbe tried to break the hold of Egypt on the Ethiopian Church by increasing the number of bishops ordained in his country to seven. However the prelate, Abba Mikael, refused, stating that this could only be done by the Patriarch of Alexandria, so the king sent letters to the Patriarch and the Muslim ruler of Egypt. The ruler was first sympathetic to the request, but the prelate warned him that with that many bishops they could appoint their own Archbishop and be free to develop "enmity and hostility" towards their Muslim neighbors. When the messengers returned with Kedus Harbe's answer, the country had experienced great famine and pestilence. "These were the first such calamities for which the historical mention exists."

References

11th-century Ethiopian people
11th-century monarchs in Africa
Emperors of Ethiopia
Year of birth unknown
Year of death unknown
Zagwe dynasty